Children's Games is an oil-on-panel by Flemish Renaissance artist Pieter Bruegel the Elder, painted in 1560. It is currently held and exhibited at the Kunsthistorisches Museum in Vienna. The entire composition is full of children playing a wide variety of games. Over 90 different games that were played by children at the time have been identified.

Description
This painting, mentioned for the first time by Karel van Mander in 1604, was acquired in 1594 by Archduke Ernest of Austria. It was suggested that it was the first in a projected series of paintings representing the Ages of Man, in which Children's Games would have stood for Youth. If that was Bruegel's intention, it is unlikely that the series progressed beyond this painting, for there are no contemporary or subsequent mentions of related pictures.

The children, who range in age from toddlers to adolescents, roll hoops, walk on stilts, spin hoops, ride hobby-horses, stage mock tournaments, play leap-frog and blind man's bluff, perform handstands, inflate pigs' bladders and play with dolls and other toys. They have also taken over the large building that dominates the square: it may be a town hall or some other important civic building, in this way emphasizing the moral that the adults who direct civic affairs are as children in the sight of God. This crowded scene is to some extent relieved by the landscape in the top left-hand corner; but even here children are bathing in the river and playing on its banks.

The artist's intention for this work is more serious than simply to compile an illustrated encyclopaedia of children's games, though some eighty particular games have been identified. Bruegel shows the children absorbed in their games with the seriousness displayed by adults in their apparently more important pursuits. His moral is that in the mind of God, children's games possess as much significance as the activities of their parents. This idea was a familiar one in contemporary literature: in an anonymous Flemish poem published in Antwerp in 1530 by Jan van Doesborch, mankind is compared to children who are entirely absorbed in their foolish games and concerns.

The games
Starting from bottom left, the games may be identified as follows:

References

External links

Children's Games at the KHM (German)
Bosch Bruegel Society
99 works by Pieter Bruegel the Elder
Creative Bruegel laid the foundation of the Netherlands School '''(Russian)

1560 paintings
Paintings by Pieter Bruegel the Elder
Paintings in the collection of the Kunsthistorisches Museum
Children's games
Paintings of children